Andrei Vasilyevich Yarygin (born 7 April 1975) is a former Russian football player.

References

1975 births
People from Ipatovsky District
Living people
Soviet footballers
Russian footballers
FC Dynamo Stavropol players
Russian Premier League players
FC Armavir players
Association football midfielders
Sportspeople from Stavropol Krai